Laurie Elizabeth Guess (born January 11, 1985) is an American soccer forward and midfielder. She last played for the Portland Thorns FC in the National Women's Soccer League.

Career

Youth and college career
Guess was born in Athens, Georgia.  She attended and played for Athens Academy in Athens, Georgia, where she received several honors and awards. Guess was a highly recruited high school All-American in high school. Guess was a 2003 McDonald's All-American, 2003 Parade All-American and 2003 NSCAA All-American. She led her team in scoring and assists all three years and was first-team All-Northeast Georgia each year. In addition to excelling in soccer, Guess also played four years of basketball as a point guard and led her basketball team in scoring, assists, steals and free throw shooting three times. Guess was named All-Northeast Georgia her freshman through senior years, first-team All-State selection as a senior, honorable mention as a sophomore and All-Area as a senior as well as the All-Northeast Georgia player of the Year as a senior.

Guess attended the University of North Carolina. While at North Carolina she played with current Breakers teammates Heather O'Reilly and Cat Whitehill. Guess also won two NCAA National Championships and three Atlantic Coast Conference Championships with the Tar Heels during her four-year college career.

Professional career

Boston Breakers
Guess was signed by the Boston Breakers as a discovery player in April 2013. After playing only one game with the Breakers in which she provided the assist to the Breaker's lone and equalizer goal, Guess was waived by the team.

Portland Thorns FC
Shortly after being waived by the Breakers, Guess was acquired by the Portland Thorns FC. She was waived by the Portland Thorns in January 2014.

International career
Guess was a member of the U.S. Under-16, Under-17 National Teams, U-23 Women's National Team and a pool player for the U.S. Under-21 National Team in 2005 and the U.S. Under-19 National Team.

Personal
Her parents are Ed and Page Allen and Amy and Frank Guess. She has two brothers and two sisters.

References

External links
 Portland Thorns player profile
 Boston Breakers player profile
 North Carolina player profile

1985 births
Living people
American women's soccer players
Portland Thorns FC players
National Women's Soccer League players
North Carolina Tar Heels women's soccer players
Parade High School All-Americans (girls' soccer)
Boston Breakers players
Eredivisie (women) players
Women's association football midfielders
Women's association football forwards
Expatriate women's footballers in the Netherlands
ADO Den Haag (women) players
Atlanta Silverbacks Women players